The history of the Romanian language started in Roman provinces north of the Jireček Line in Classical antiquity. Between 6th and 8th century AD, following the accumulated tendencies inherited from the vernacular spoken in this large area and, to a much smaller degree, the influences from the Thraco-Dacian substratum, and in the context of a lessened power of the Roman central authority the language evolved into Common Romanian. This proto-language then came into close contact with the Slavic languages and subsequently divided into Aromanian, Megleno-Romanian, Istro-Romanian, and Daco-Romanian. Because of limited attestation between 6th and 16th century, entire stages from its history are reconstructed by researchers, often with proposed relative chronologies and loose limits.

Background

A number of Romance languages were once spoken in Southeastern Europe for centuries, but the Dalmatian branch of this Eastern Romance disappeared centuries ago. Although the surviving Eastern group of Balkan Romance has in the meantime split into four major languages, their common features show that all of them originated from the same proto-language. Romanian, the largest among these languages, is spoken by more than 20 million people, primarily in Romania and Moldova. Aromanian has about 350,000 speakers who mainly live in the mountainous zones of Albania, Greece, and Macedonia. Some thousand people from the wider region of Thessaloniki speak the third language which is known as Megleno-Romanian. The smallest Eastern Romance language, Istro-Romanian is used by fewer than 1,500 speakers in Istria.

External history

Substratum 

Little is known of the substratum language but it is generally assumed to be an Indo-European language related to Albanian. Most linguist like Kim Schulte and Grigore Brâncuș use the phrase "Thraco-Dacian" substratum, while Herbert J. Izzo and Vékony argue that the Eastern Romance languages developed on an Illyrian substrate. However, the small number of known Dacian, Illyrian or Thracian words excludes the systematic comparison of these idioms either with each other or with other languages. Dacian is represented by about a hundred plant names, 43 names of towns in Dacia as recorded by Ptolemy and around 1150 Dacian anthroponyms and 900 toponyms that have been preserved in ancient sources. The number of known Thracian or Illyrian wordsmainly glosses, place names and personal namesis even smaller.

Estimates of the number of Romanian words of substratum origin range between about 90 and 140. At least 70 of these words have Albanian cognates, which may indicate a common Albanian–Romanian substratum. However, borrowings from Albanian to Romanian cannot be excluded either. The linguists Gottfried Schramm, and István Schütz even propose that they were borrowed in several phases. 

The largest semantic field (46 out the 89 considered certain to be of substratum) is formed by words describing nature: terrain, flora and fauna, and about 30% of these words with Albanian cognate are connected to pastoral life. The proportion of words with Albanian cognates are found in the semantic fields of the physical world (4.8%), kinship (3.2%), agriculture and vegetation (2.8%), and animals (2.7%). 

Some linguists like Schramm propose that they did not stem from a pre-Latin substratum, but are loanwords borrowed from a pastoralist population by the Romans' ancestors who adopted their neighbors' mobile lifestyle when they took refuge in the mountains following the collapse of the Roman Empire in the 6th or 7th centuries.  Schütz argues that a number of Romanian words which are traditionally supposed to have been derived from hypothetical Vulgar Latin terms are in fact Albanian loanwords. Even Romanian words of Latin or Slavic origin seem to have been borrowed through Albanian mediation. Parallel changes in the meaning of a number of Latin words in the Albanian and the Romanian languages can also be illustrated. Recent studies however show that they are in fact substratum words in Romanian from Thraco-Dacian as evident in the rhotacism of intervocalic -l- in the pair Alb. vjedhullë - Rom. viezure for example, or the evolution of "dz" in words like bardzu  typical of Latin to Romanian development. In general the argument that these are loanwords, based on the reason they are derivative forms in Albanian and only show as isolates in Romanian, is disproved by similarity of the Romanian word to Proto-Albanian, the language spoken before the 6th or 7th century. For example the Albanian word sorrë (crow) shows the change from ⟨t͡ʃ⟩ to s in Late Proto-Albanian, while Romanian has retained the old form cioară pronounced /ˈt͡ʃo̯a.rə/. A number of Albanian–Romanian calques exist.

The common morphological and syntactic features of Romanian with Albanian, Bulgarian, and other languages spoken in Southeastern Europe can be attributed to a common substratum. However, this hypothesis cannot be proven, because of modern scholars' limited knowledge of the native idioms spoken in the region. Accordingly, it is also possible that these common features are to be attributed to parallel developments in all languages. According to the linguist Rebecca Posner, it is not impossible that the existence of the close central unrounded vowel of Romanianwhich is marked by the letters "î" or "â"can also be traced back to the pre-Latin substratum, but she adds that "there is little evidence to support this hypothesis".

Romanization and Vulgar Latin

The integration of Southeastern European territories into the Roman Empire began with the establishment of the province of Illyricum on the Adriatic coast around 60 BC. The Dalmatian language which occupied an intermediary position between Romanian and Italian started to develop in these coastal regions. The Roman expansion towards the Danube continued in the 1st century AD. New provinces were established, including Pannonia in 9 AD, Moesia under Emperor Claudius (r. 41–54), and Roman Dacia in 106. The presence of legions and auxiliary troops ensured the Romans' control over the natives. The establishment of colonies also contributed to the consolidation of Roman rule. Accordingly, a relatively peaceful period which lasted till the end of the 2nd century followed everywhere the conquest. This Pax Romana was instrumental in the "standardization of language, customs, architecture, housing and technology". Even so, St Jerome and later authors evidence that Illyrian and other native tongues survived at least up until the late 4th century.

Latin's literary register and its spoken vernacular, now known as "Classical Latin" and "Vulgar Latin" respectively, started to diverge by the time of the Roman conquest of Southeastern Europe. Accordingly, the Roman colonists introduced these popular forms when they settled in the newly conquered provinces. Inscriptions from the Roman period evidence that the Latin tongue of Southeastern Europe developed in line with the evolution of the language in the empire's other parts at least until the end of the 3rd century. Likewise, a number of inherited Romanian words testify to the fact that the Latin variety from which they emerged underwent the changes affecting the phonemes, lexicon, and other features of the Latin in the same period. For instance, the merger of the close e and open i vowels into a close "e" can be demonstrated through inherited Romanian words, and many items of Romanian vocabulary had its origin in popular terms instead of literary forms.
 
 
Trajan's Dacia to the north of the Lower Danube was abandoned in the early 270s. Those who left these territories were settled to the south of the river where a new province bearing the same name, Aurelian's Dacia was carved out of Moesia. However, written sources refer to the use of Latin in the territories to the north of the Lower Danube up until the 6th century. Priscus of Panium's report of his visit in the court of Attila the Hun in 448 evidence that all "subjects of the Huns" who had "commercial dealings with" the Western Roman Empire spoke Latin, "but none of them easily" spoke Greek. He also met Rusticius from Moesia who acted as interpreter, Constantiolus, "a man from the Pannonian territory", and "Zerkon, the Moorish dwarf" whose words  "were a confused jumble of Latin, Hunnic, and Gothic". A century later Procopius of Caesarea wrote of a prisoner of war who "was by birth of the Antae", but who "spoke in the Latin tongue"

The Goths and other neighboring tribes made frequent raids against the Roman territories in the decades following the Romans' withdrawal from Trajan's Dacia, but the Emperors Diocletian (r. 284–305) and Constantine the Great (r. 324–337) consolidated the empire's frontiers. The empire was officially divided into two parts in 395, but Latin remained one of the two official languages of the Eastern Roman Empire up to the early 7th century. For instance, when Leo II was proclaimed emperor in Constantinople in 474, his armies hailed him in Latin. Emperor Justinian I (r. 527–565) who was born in Dardania even stated that Latin was his native language (paternus sermo). Eastern Roman rule in the Balkan Peninsula collapsed under Emperor Heraclius (r. 610–641).

Inscriptions and literary sources evidence that Latin remained the predominant language of communication in the provinces along the Danube throughout the 4th and 6th centuries. For the same reason, Justinian's Novels were published in Latin for these provinces. The last Latin inscriptions in the region are dated to the 610s. Gábor Vékony argues that some place names recorded in The Buildings of Justinian by Procopius of Caesarea show vowel shifts which characterize the development of Romanian. For instance, the featuring shift from "o" to "u" seems to be reflected in the name of Scumbroa fortress in the region of Remesiana (now Bela Palanka, Serbia)which cannot be independent of the ancient Scombrus mons name of the Vitosha Mountains. The major hydronymy North of the Danube is inherited from Thraco-Dacian, but with one exception, the Romanian name of these rivers is not in line with the phonetical evolution of Romanian from Latin. Theophylact Simocatta and Theophanes the Confessor recorded the first wordstorna, torna fratre ("turn, turn brother") or torna, torna ("turn, turn") which may be attributed to the Romanian language. These words were shouted by a soldier from the region between the Haemus Mountains and the Upper Thracian Plain "in his native tongue" during an Eastern Roman campaign of 587.

The Latin variety from which Romanian developed shows the traits of many changes of the Latin which occurred in the 4th and 6th centuries. However, these changes cannot always be detected in all Romance languages which suggests that the Latin language underwent a process of regional differentiation in this period. Ovid Densusianu wrote, already in 1901,  of a Vulgar Latin which "lost its unity, breaking into languages that developed into today's Romance languages.  For instance, the sonorization of the voiceless consonants between vowels which can be demonstrated during the formation of the Western Romance languages cannot be detected in the evolution of the Eastern Romance and Dalmatian languages. In many cases, Romanian share common features with Italian, Romansh and Dalmatian languages. Nandriș argues that these common features suggest that "for some time the development of Carpatho-Balkan Latin" (that is of old Romanian) "moved along the same lines as the Latin of the Adriatic coast and that of the Alps and of South-Eastern Italy." On the other hand, he argues that the similar features of the Romanian and Sardinian languages "are explained by the principle of peripheral areas in dialectal development".

Proto-Romanian

Romanian linguist Ovid Densusianu coined the term "Thraco-Roman" in 1901 to describe the "oldest epoch of the creation of the Romanian language", when the Vulgar Latin spoken in the Balkans between the 4th and 6th centuries, having its own peculiarities, had evolved into what is known as Proto-Romanian. Estimates of the ratio of Romanian words directly inherited from Latin is around 20% The proportion of words of Latin origin is especially high in the semantic fields of sense perception (86.1%), quantity (82.3%), kinship (76.9%), and time (74.7%). More than 90% of the function words, 80% of the adverbs and 68% of the adjectives in the Romanian language were directly inherited from Latin. 
 

 

Some Latin terms connected to an urbanized society survived by being adapted to rural environment, for example pământ from pavimentum, and the vocabulary for navigation, higher religious organization, and education was considerably reduced.  Inherited Romanian words for "road" also reveal that the life of the Romanians' ancestors became more rural after the collapse of Roman civilization. For instance, the Latin word for bridge pons developed into Romanian punte which refers to a tree trunk placed over a ditch or a ravine, while the Romanian word for road cale developed from Latin callis 'a narrow footpath, a track'. Grigore Nandriș emphasizes that Romanian "terms for «to move from one place to another» seem to be particularly numerous". Likewise, Romanian verbs referring to "going" developed from Latin verbs with a different meaning.

Based on a study of inherited Latin words and loanwords in the Romanian language, Nandriș, Schramm, Vékony and other scholars conclude that the Romanians stemmed from a population who inhabited the mountainous zones of Southeastern Europe and were primarily engaged in animal husbandry. For instance, Schramm emphasizes that "the Romanians inherited the word for «to plow» from Latin, but borrowed both the names of the parts of the plough [...] and the terminology of the intricacies of plowing techniques from Slavic" which suggests that their ancestors only preserved some very basic knowledge of cultivation of plants. However, as linguist Marius Sala says, the Slavic terms entered Romanian language by designating improved tools compared to the ones used by the Daco-Roman population, replacing the old words inherited from Latin. The old word for plough has been inherited in Aromanian as "arat" from the Latin "arātrum" while the improved tool took the Slavic name. Other scholars, including historian Victor Spinei, state that the great number of names of crops and agricultural techniques directly inherited from Latin indicates "a very long continuity of agricultural practices". Grigore Brâncuș adds to this list that the majority of pomiculture, numerous apicultural, and all the swineherding terms complete a view of a mixed farming society involved in both the growing of crops and the raising of livestock. 

Like only a few other Romance languages, Romanian has preserved the Romanus endonym. Its rumân variantwhich referred to serfs was first recorded in the 1500s, while its român variant is documented as early as the 17th century. However, other peoples referred to the Romanians as Vlach throughout the Middle Ages. This exonym and its variants stemmed from a reconstructed Germanic word *walhaz, by which the ancient Germans initially referred specifically to the Celts, then to the Romanized Celts, and finally to all Romance-speakers. It was adopted by the Slavs and from them the Greeks.

Historians have not reached a consensus on the date of the first historical event which can, without doubt, connect to Romanians. The Romanian historian Ioan-Aurel Pop makes mention of "written records" which refer to Romanians existing in the 8th and 9th centuries but does not name any of them. Vlad Georgescu cites a "ninth-century Armenian geography" which refers to an "unknown country called Balak", but Victor Spinei emphasizes that it is an interpolation "probably from the first centuries of the second millennium". Spinei himself suggests that the first recorded events of the Romanians' history are connected to their fights against the Hungarians in territories to the north of the Danube around 895. In this respect, he cites the Russian Primary Chronicle from the 1120s and the late 13th-century Gesta Hungarorum. However, the idea that the Primary Chronicle refers to Romanians has not been universally accepted. Likewise, specialists have often questioned the reliability of the Gesta Hungarorum. All the same, it is without doubt that especially Vlachs of the Balkan Peninsula are mentioned by Byzantine sources in connection with events of the late 10th century. Spinei and Georgescu propose that the Blakumen of a Varangian runestone from around 1050 are the first Romanians whose presence in the lands east of the Carpathians was recorded.

The western regions of the Pontic steppes were dominated from around 837 by the Hungarians, between around 895 and 1046 by the Pechenegs, from around 1046 by the Ouzes, and between around 1064 and 1241 by the Cumans. The Hungarians who settled in the lowlands of the Carpathian Basin around 895 established a state around 1000 which gradually integrated Banat, Transylvania and other regions of present-day Romania.

Slavic adstratum

 
Huge territories to the north of the Lower Danube were dominated by Goths and Gepids for at least 300 years from the 270s, but no Romanian words of East Germanic origin have so far been detected. On the other hand, Slavic influence on Romanian was much stronger than Germanic influence on French, Italian, Spanish and other Western Romance languages. Although "a number of Slavic loanwords have fallen victim to a strong re-latinisation process since the 19th century", the proportion of Slavic loanwords is still around 15%. The ratio of Slavic loanwords is especially high in the semantic fields of house (26,5%), religion and belief (25%), basic actions and technology (22,6%), social and political relations (22,5%), and agriculture and vegetation (22,5%). About 20% of the Romanian adverbs, nearly 17% of the nouns, and around 14% of the verbs are of Slavic origin. Slavic loanwords often coexist with a synonym inherited from Latin which sometimes give rise to semantic differentiation. For instance, both inherited "timp" and the Slavic loanword "vreme" may refer to either time or weather, but nowadays "vreme" is preferred in meteorological context. Loanwords borrowed from Slavic often have an emotional context, and they represent a positive connotation in many cases. Many linguistsincluding Günther Reichenkron and Robert A. Hallargue that these features of the Slavic loanwords point at the one-time existence of bilingual communities with many Slavic speakers adopting Romanian, but their view have not been universally accepted.

The earliest stratum of Slavic loanwordswhich is now represented by around 80 termswas adopted in the Common Slavic period which ended around 850. However, the majority of Romanian words of Slavic origin was only adopted after the metathesis of the Common Slavic *tort-formulawhich was "a specific type of syllable whereby t stands for any consonant, o for either e or o, and r for both r and l"had been completed. Old Church Slavonic terms also enriched the Romanians' religious vocabulary in this period. Proto-Romanian even adopted words of Latin or Greek origin through Slavic mediation in this period. The bulk of the Old Church Slavonic loanwords has been preserved by all Eastern Romance languages which implies that their split into separate languages did not start before ca. 900. Each Eastern Romance language and its dialects adopted loanwords from the neighboring Slavic peoples thereafter. For instance, Ukrainian and Russian influenced the northern Romanian dialects, while Croatian influenced Istro-Romanian.

In addition to vocabulary, Slavic languages also had effects on Eastern Romance phonology and morphology, although their extent is debated by specialists. The iotation of e in word-initial position in some basic wordsthat is the appearance of a semi vowel j before e in these terms is one of the Romanian phonological features with a debated origin. Peter R. Petrucci argues that it was the consequence of a language shift from Common Slavic to Eastern Romance, while Grigore Nandriș emphasizes that "Latin e was diphthongised at an early period not only in" Romanian "but also in most Romance languages". The formation of numerals between eleven and nineteen clearly follow Slavic patternfor instance, unsprezece "one-on-ten", doisprezece "two-on-ten", and nouăsprezece "nine-on-ten"which also indicates that a significant number of originally Slavic-speaking people once adopted Romanian.

Pre-literary Romanian

The Romanians' presence in the Kingdom of Hungary is proven by nearly contemporary sources from the beginning of the 13th century. The Pechenegs and the Cumans spoke Turkic languages, but the distinction of words borrowed from them and loanwords of Crimean Tatar or Ottoman Turkish origin is almost impossible. For instance, Lazăr Șăineanu proposes that the Romanian word for mace (buzdugan) stemmed from the Cumans or Pechenegs, but no maces dated to the period before around 1300 have been unearthed in the Pontic steppes. According to István Schütz, ciobana Romanian word for shepherd which also exists in Albanian, Bulgarian and many other Slavic languagescan be of Pecheneg or Cuman origin. The cohabition of Romanians and Hungarians caused that the former adopted a number of Hungarian words. The proportion of Hungarian loanwords is now about 1,6%. Their ratio is relatively high in the semantic fields of social and political relations (6,5%), clothing and grooming (4,5%), speech and language (4,5%), and the house (4,3%). Although most Hungarian loanwords have spread in all Romanian dialects, many of them are only used in Transylvania.

While some Eastern Romance languages and dialects adopted a number of loanwords in the course of their development, others remained more conservative. In this respect, the Wallachian dialect of Romanian is the most innovative of all Romanian dialects. Many linguists and historiansincluding Grigore Nandriș and Alexandru Madgearueven propose that the preservation of inherited Latin words by the dialects spoken in Roman Dacia which were replaced by loanwords in other regions proves that these territories served as centres of "linguistic expansion". Likewise, the Maramureș dialect has also preserved words of Latin origin which disappeared from most other dialecs. On the other hand, Aromanian, although it is now spoken in regions where its development could not start still uses a number of inherited Latin terms instead of the loanwords which were adopted by other Eastern Romance languages.

Old Romanian

What is traditionally called "Old Romanian language" period begins in 16th and ends in 18th century. The Polish chronicler Jan Długosz remarked in 1476 that Moldavians and Wallachians "share a language and customs". The oldest surviving writing in Romanian that can be reliably dated is a letter sent by Lupu Neacșu from the then Dlăgopole, now Câmpulung, Wallachia, to Johannes Benkner of Brașov, Transylvania. From the events and people mentioned in the letter it can be inferred that it was written around the 29th or 30 June 1521. Other documents do exist from the same period, but could not be dated accurately.

Francesco della Valle writes in 1532 that "they name themselves Romei in their own language" ("si dimandano in lingua loro Romei") and, he also cites the expression "Do you know Romanian?" ("se alcuno dimanda se sano parlare in la lingua valacca, dicono a questo in questo modo: Sti Rominest ? Che vol dire: Sai tu Romano?").<ref>"...si dimandano in lingua loro Romei...se alcuno dimanda se sano parlare in la lingua valacca, dicono a questo in questo modo: Sti Rominest? Che vol dire: Sai tu Romano?..." in: Claudiu Isopescu, Notizie intorno ai romeni nella letteratura geografica italiana del Cinquecento, in Bulletin de la Section Historique, XVI, 1929, p. 1- 90</ref>

Tranquillo Andronico, in 1534, remarks that ""Vlachs now name themselves Romanians (Valachi nunc se Romanos vocant).

In 1542, the Transylvanian Szekler Johann Lebel wrote that "the Vlachs name each other Romuini".

The Polish chronicler Stanislaw Orzechowski mentions in 1554 that "in their language, the Vlachs name themselves Romini".

In 1570, the Croatian Ante Verančić specifies that "the Vlachs from Transylvania, Moldova and Transalpina name themselves Romans".

Pierre Lescalopier writes, in 1574 that "those that live in Moldova, Wallachia and most of Transylvania consider themselves as being descendants of Romans and name their language Romanian".

Ferrante Capecci, after travelling in 1575 through Wallachia, Transylvania and Moldova, mentions that the dwellers of these lands are named "Romanesci".

The Palia de la Orăștie of 1580 is the oldest translation of the Pentateuch that is written in the Romanian language.

Grigore Ureche, in his The Chronicles of the land of Moldavia (Romanian Letopisețul Țării Moldovei) (1640s), talks about the language spoken by the Moldavians and considers it to be an amalgam of numerous languages (Latin, French, Greek, Polish, Turkish, Serbian, etc.) and is mixed with the neighbouring languages.  The author however assumes the preponderance of Latin influence, and claims that, at a closer look, all Latin words could be understood by Moldavians.

Miron Costin, in his De neamul moldovenilor (1687) while noting that Moldavians, Wallachians, and the Romanians living in the Hungarian Country have the same origin, says that although people of Moldavia call themselves "Moldavians", they name their language "Romanian" (românește) instead of Moldavian (moldovenește). Also, in his Polish language Chronicle of Wallachia and Moldavia, Miron Costin assumes that both Wallachians and Moldavians once called themselves "Romans".

Dimitrie Cantemir, in his Descriptio Moldaviae (Berlin, 1714), points out that the inhabitants of Moldavia, Wallachia and Transylvania spoke the same language. He notes, however, that there are some differences in accent and vocabulary. He says:

"Wallachians and Transylvanians have the same speech as the Moldavians, but their pronunciation is slightly harsher, such as giur, which a Wallachian will pronounce jur, using a Polish ż or a French j. [...] They also have words that the Moldavians don't understand, but they don't use them in writing."

Cantemir's work is one of the earliest histories of the language, in which he notes, like Ureche before him, the evolution from Latin and notices the Greek, Turkish and Polish borrowings. Additionally, he introduces the idea that some words must have had Dacian roots. Cantemir also notes that while the idea of a Latin origin of the language was prevalent in his time, other scholars considered it to have derived from Italian.

In old sources, such as the works of chroniclers Grigore Ureche (1590–1647), Miron Costin (1633–1691), or those of the Prince and scholar Dimitrie Cantemir (1673–1723), the term Moldavian (moldovenească) can be found. According to Cantemir's Descriptio Moldaviae, the inhabitants of Wallachia and Transylvania spoke the same language as Moldavians, but they had a different pronunciation and used some words not understood by Moldovans. Costin and, in an unfinished book, Cantemir attest the usage of the term Romanian among the inhabitants of the Principality of Moldavia to refer to their own language.

Romanian in Imperial Russia 

Following annexation of Bessarabia by Russia (after 1812), the language of Moldavians was established as an official language in the governmental institutions of Bessarabia, used along with Russian, as the overwhelming majority of the population was Romanian. The publishing works established by Archbishop Gavril Bănulescu-Bodoni were able to produce books and liturgical works in Moldavian between 1815 and 1820.

Gradually, the Russian language gained importance. The new code adopted in 1829 abolished the autonomous statute of Bessarabia, and halted the obligatory use of Moldavian in public pronouncements. In 1854, Russian was declared the only official language of the region, Moldavian being eliminated from schools in the second part of the century

According to the dates provided by the administration of Bessarabia, since 1828, official documents were published in Russian only, and around 1835 a 7-year term was established during which state institutions would accept acts in the Romanian language, after which the used language would be exclusively Russian.

Romanian was accepted as the language of instruction until 1842, afterwards being taught as a separate subject. Thus, at the seminary of Chișinău, the Romanian language was a compulsory subject, with 10 hours weekly, until 1863, when the Department of Romanian was closed. At the High School No.1 in Chișinău, students had the right to choose among Romanian, German, and Greek until 9 February 1866, when the State Counselor of the Russian Empire forbade teaching of the Romanian language, with the following justification: "the pupils know this language in the practical mode, and its teaching follows other goals".

Around 1871, the tsar published an ukase "On the suspension of teaching the Romanian language in the schools of Bessarabia," because "local speech is not taught in the Russian Empire". Bessarabia became a regular guberniya and the Russification policy became a priority for the administration.

The linguistic situation in Bessarabia from 1812 to 1918 was the gradual development of bilingualism. Russian continued to develop as the official language of privilege, whereas Romanian remained the principal vernacular. The evolution of this linguistic situation can be divided into five phases.

The period from 1812 to 1828 was one of neutral or functional bilingualism. Whereas Russian had official dominance, Romanian was not without influence, especially in the spheres of public administration, education (particularly religious education) and culture. In the years immediately following the annexation, loyalty to Romanian language and customs became important. The Theological Seminary (Seminarul Teologic) and Lancaster Schools were opened in 1813 and 1824 respectively, Romanian grammar books were published, and the printing press at Chișinău began producing religious books.

The period from 1828 to 1843 was one of partial diglossic bilingualism. During this time, use of Romanian was forbidden in the sphere of administration. This was carried out through negative means: Romanian was excluded from the civil code. Romanian continued to be used in education, but only as a separate subject. Bilingual manuals, such as the Russian-Romanian Bucoavne grammar of Iacob Ghinculov, were published to meet the new need for bilingualism. Religious books and Sunday sermons remained the only monolingual public outlet for Romanian. By 1843, the removal of Romanian from public administration was complete.

The period from 1843 to 1871 was one of assimilation. Romanian continued to be a school subject at the Liceul Regional (high school) until 1866, at the Theological Seminary until 1867, and at regional schools until 1871, when all teaching of the language was forbidden by law.

The period from 1871 to 1905 was one of official monolingualism in Russian. All public use of Romanian was phased out, and substituted with Russian. Romanian continued to be used as the colloquial language of home and family. This was the era of the highest level of assimilation in the Russian Empire. In 1872, the priest Pavel Lebedev ordered that all church documents be written in Russian, and, in 1882, the press at Chișinău was closed by order of the Holy Synod.

The period from 1905 to 1917 was one of increasing linguistic conflict, with the re-awakening of Romanian national consciousness. In 1905 and 1906, the Bessarabian zemstva asked for the re-introduction of Romanian in schools as a "compulsory language", and the "liberty to teach in the mother language (Romanian language)". At the same time, the first Romanian language newspapers and journals began to appear: Basarabia (1906), Viața Basarabiei (1907), Moldovanul (1907), Luminătorul (1908), Cuvînt moldovenesc (1913), Glasul Basarabiei (1913). From 1913, the synod permitted that "the churches in Besserabia use the Romanian language".

The term "Moldovan language" (limbă moldovenească) was newly employed to create a state-sponsored Ausbausprache to distinguish it from 'Romanian' Romanian. Thus, șt. Margeală, in 1827, stated that the aim of his book was to "offer the 800,000 Romanians who live in Bessarabia,... as well as to the millions of Romanians from the other part of Prut, the possibility of knowing the Russian language, and also for the Russians who want to study the Romanian language". In 1865 Ioan Doncev, editing his Romanian primer and grammar, affirmed that Moldovan is valaho-româno, or Romanian. However, after this date, the label "Romanian language" appears only sporadically in the correspondence of the educational authorities. Gradually, Moldovan became the sole label for the language: a situation that proved useful to those who wished for a cultural separation of Bessarabia from Romania. Although referring to another historical period, Kl. Heitmann stated that the "theory of two languages — Romanian and Moldovan — was served both in Moscow as well as in Chișinău to combat the nationalistic veleities of the Republic of Moldova, being, in fact, an action against Romanian nationalism". (Heitmann, 1965). The objective of the Russian language policies in Bessarabia was the dialectization of the Romanian language. A. Arțimovici, official of the Education Department based in Odessa, wrote a letter, dated 11 February 1863, to the Minister of Public Instructions stating: "I have the opinion that it will be hard to stop the Romanian population of Bessarabia using the language of the neighbouring principalities, where the concentrated Romanian population may develop the language based on its Latin elements, not good for Slavic language.  The government's directions pertaining to this case aim to make a new dialect in Bessarabia, more closely based on Slavic language, will be, as it will be seen, of no use: we cannot direct the teachers to teach a language that will soon be dead in Moldova and Wallachia... parents will not want their children to learn a different language to the one they currently speak". Although some clerks, like Arțimovici, realised that the creation of a dialect apart from the Romanian spoken in the United Principalities could never be truly effective, most of them "with the aim of fulfilling governmental policy, tendentiously called the majority language Moldovan, even in the context where Romanian had always been used previously".

Modern Romanian

The period starting from 1780, from the publishing of Elementa linguae daco-romanae sive valachicae, is categorised as Modern Romanian, characterised by the translation, publishing and printing of books using both Cyrillic and Latin orthography, until the full implementation of the current Romanian alphabet in 1881, and by the influence of Latino-romance languages, in particular French, on the Romanian lexis. This influence, together with the adoption of the Latin script and the work of two schools of thought (Transylvanian School's Latin oriented approach and I.H. Rădulescu's Italian oriented) is the context in which the terms Re-Latinisation, Re-Romanization or Westernization are discussed. The Latin model was applied to French loanwords such as objection to "objecție", or doublets of Latin inherited words are popularised as in dens/des, both from Latin densus - dens being a loanword from French, while des, with similar meaning, is inherited from Latin.

Internal history

This section presents the sound changes that happened from Latin to Romanian. The order in which the sound changes are listed here is not necessarily chronological.

Up to Proto-Romanian

Vowels

In the Vulgar Latin period
Classical Latin had ten pure vowels (monophthongs), along with three diphthongs. By the 1st century AD, if not earlier, Latin diphthong  became , with the quality of short  but longer; and  soon afterwards became , merging with long . This left . But in general, the territories outside of Rome were unaffected by this change;  remained everywhere for centuries afterward, and continues to this day in Romanian.

Long and short  differed in both quality and quantity, with the shorter versions lower and laxer (e.g.   vs.  ).  Long and short  differed only in quantity.  At a certain point, quantity ceased being phonemic, with all vowels long in stressed open syllables and short elsewhere.  This automatically caused long and short  to merge, but the remaining vowels took two different paths:
In the Sardinian scheme, long and short pairs of vowels simply merge, with the quality difference erased.
In the Western Romance scheme, the quality difference remains, but original short   are lowered and merge with original long  .  Subsequent to this, unstressed low-mid vowels are raised to become high-mid.
Romanian and other Eastern Romance languages follow a mixed scheme, with the back vowels  following the Sardinian scheme but the front vowels  following the Western Romance scheme.  This produces a six-vowel system (contrast the Sardinian five-vowel system and Western Romance seven-vowel system).

Short and long back vowels merged, for example:
 Lat. mare > Rom. mare ('sea')
 Lat. pālum > *paru > Rom. par ('pole')
 Lat. focum > *focu > Rom. foc ('fire')
 Lat. pōmum > *pomu > Rom. pom ('fruit-bearing tree')
 Lat. multum > *multu > Rom. mult ('much')
 Lat. tū > Rom. tu ('you')

Latin short  seems to have been lowered to o when stressed and before m or b in some words:

 Lat. autumna (from autumnus) > *tomna > Rom. toamnă ('autumn')
 Lat. rubeum > *robi̯u > Rom. roib

Also, Latin long  was changed to u in a few words:

 Lat. cohortem > *cōrtem > Rom. curte

Front vowels changed as follows:
 / and  became .
  became .
 / became:
  in stressed syllables
  in unstressed syllables
Examples:
 Lat. pellem > * > Rom. piele  ('skin')
 Lat. signum > *semnu > Rom. semn ('sign')
 Lat. vīnum > *vinu > Rom. vin ('wine')

Breaking of stressed open e
This happened in all syllables, whether open or closed, similarly to Spanish, but unlike Italian or French, where this breaking only happened in open syllables (those followed by only a single consonant).

 Lat. pellem > * > Rom. piele  'skin'

 Lat. decem > * > *di̯ece > *dzece > Rom. zece 'ten'

 Lat. equa > * > *i̯epa > Rom. iapă 'mare'
 Lat. terra > * > *ti̯era > *țera > archaic țeară > Rom. țară 'land'
 Lat. testa > * > *ti̯esta > *țesta > Rom. țeastă 'skull'

Breaking of e and o
The vowel o was broken (diphthongized) to oa before a non-high vowel:

 Lat. flōrem > Rom. floare 'flower'
 Lat. hōram > Rom. oară 'time' as in "a treia oară" 'the third time'

The vowel e was broken to ea in similar circumstances. The e was often absorbed by a preceding palatal sound:

 Lat. equa > * > *i̯epa > *i̯eapa > Rom. iapă 'mare'
 Lat. terra > * > *ti̯era > *țera > archaic țeară > Rom. țară 'land'
 Lat. testa > * > *ti̯esta > *țesta > Rom. țeastă 'skull'

As a result, these diphthongs still alternate with the original monophthongs by occurring regularly before a, ă and e in the next syllable (with the exception that ea has reverted to e before another e, e.g. mensae > mease > mese 'tables', as explained in the next section).

Backing of e
The vowel e was changed to ă – and the diphthong ea was reduced to a – when preceded by a labial consonant and followed by a back vowel in the next syllable. In other words, it stayed e, when the following vowel was i or e. Furthermore, in front of these vowels, the diphthong ea changed back to e.

 Lat. pilus > peru > Rom. păr 'hair', but
 Lat. pilī > Rom. peri 'hairs'
 Lat. pēra > peară > Rom. pară 'pear', but
 Lat. pērae > peare > Rom. pere 'pears'
 Lat. mēnsam > *mesa > measă > Rom. masă 'table', but
 Lat. mēnsae > mease > Rom. mese 'tables'
 Lat. vēndō > *vendu > *văndu > *vându > Rom. vând 'I sell', but
 Lat. vēndis > *vendī > *vendzi > vindzi > Rom. vinzi 'you sell'

This phonetic change is characteristic for standard Romanian, but it did not affect the dialect spoken in Țara Hațegului.

The consonant r also causes backing of e to ă: Lat. rēus > Rom. rău ‘bad’. Another source of ă is that a raises to ă in front of /i/ in the next syllable, e.g. mare ‘sea’, but mări ‘seas’.

Vowel reduction
Unstressed a became ă (except when at the beginning of the word) and unstressed o was reduced to u. Then ă became e after palatal consonants. Unstressed o was kept in some words due to analogy.

 Lat. capra > Rom. capră ‘goat’
 Lat. vīnea > *vinja > *viɲă (cf. Megleno-Romanian) > *viɲe (cf. Aromanian) > Rom. vie  ‘vineyard’
 Lat. formōsus > *frumosu > Rom. frumos ‘beautiful’

Phonemicisation of ă, pre-nasal raising and emergence of 
As the definite article -a emerged, it created new word forms with unstressed -/a/: casă  ‘house’ ~ casa  ‘the house.’ Furthermore, instances of stressed ă arose from original a before a /n/ or a consonant cluster beginning with /m/. Subsequently, ă under the same conditions (from original a as well as from e after it first evolved into i) developed into the vowel  (currently spelt as î at word edges and â elsewhere), e.g. Lat. campus > Rom. câmp ‘field’, Lat. ventus > vintu (Aromanian) > Rom. vânt ‘wind’. This was part of a general process of pre-nasal raising, which also affected the other vowels: Lat. bene > Rom. bine ‘well’, Lat. nomen > Rom. nume ‘name’. Latin i also sometimes produces  before nasals: Lat. sinus > sân ‘breast’. Subsequently, deletion of /n/ in some words produces instances of phonemic : Lat. quantum > Rom. cât ‘how much’.

The same vowel also arises from i, e and ă in front of a cluster of /r/ and a following cosonant: Lat. virtutem > Rom. vârtute ‘virtue’, Lat. pergola > Rom. pârghie ‘lever’, Lat. tardivus > Rom. târziu ‘late’. The vowel also arises from i after /r/: Lat. ridet > Rom. râde ‘laughs’. Further instances of  arose with the introduction of Slavic and, later, Turkish loanwords.

Consonants

Labiovelars
In the Vulgar Latin period, the labiovelars   were reduced to simple velars  before front vowels.
Lat. quaerere "to seek" > *kɛrere > Rom. cere 'ask'
Lat. sanguis "blood" > *sange > Rom. sânge 

The labiovelars originally remained before a, but were subsequently changed to labials , although in question words beginning with qu-, this was never changed to p- (presumably through analogy with words beginning que-, qui-, quo- in Latin):
 Lat. quattuor > *quattro > Rom. patru 'four'
 Lat. equa > * > *i̯epa > Rom. iapă 'mare'
 Lat. lingua > Rom. limbă 'tongue'
But Lat. quandō > *kando > kăndu (Aromanian) > Rom. când 'when'

Labialization of velars
Another important change is the labialization of velars before dentals, which includes the changes ct > pt, gn  > mn, and x  > ps. Later, ps assimilated to ss, then to s ~ ș in most words.

 Lat. factum > *faptu > Rom. fapt 'fact; deed'
 Lat. signum > *semnu > Rom. semn 'sign'
 Lat. coxa > *copsa > Rom. coapsă 'thigh', but:
 Lat. fraxinus > frapsinu (Aromanian) > Rom. frasin 'ash tree' (vs. Banat frapsăn, frapsine)
 Lat. laxō > *lapso > *lassu > Rom. las 'I let'

Final consonants
In both Romanian and Italian, virtually all final consonants were lost. As a consequence, there was a period in the history of Romanian in which all words ended with vowels. In addition, after a long vowel final -s produced a new final -i, as in Lat. nōs > Rom. noi 'we', Lat. trēs > Rom. trei 'three', and Lat. stās > Rom. stai 'you stand'.

Palatalization
In Vulgar Latin, short  and  followed by another vowel were changed to a glide . Later,  palatalized preceding  and  consonants, changing its quality. For dentals, the outcome depended on whether word stress precedes or follows:
dentals:
 after stress
 Lat. puteus > *púti̯u > *putsu > Rom. puț 'well, pit',
 Lat. hordeum > *órdi̯u > ordzu > Rom. orz 'barley', 
 before stress
 Lat. rōgātiōnem > *rogati̯óne > *rogačone > Rom. rugăciune 'prayer'
 VLat. deosum > *di̯ósu > *djosu > Rom. jos 'down'
 other consonants:
 Lat. socium > *sóki̯u > *sotsu > Rom. soț 'companion; husband'
 Lat. cāseus > *kasi̯u > Rom. caș 'fresh, unripened cheese'
 Lat. vīnea > *vini̯a > * > standard Rom. vie 
 Lat. mulierem > *muli̯ere > * > Rom. muiere  'woman'

Notice that the twofold outcome for dentals is still productive in modern Romanian:
credínță 'faith' — credinciós 'faithful'
(From oglíndă 'mirror':) oglínzi 'mirrors' — oglinjoáră 'small mirror'.

The above palatalizations occurred in all of the Romance languages, although with slightly differing outcomes in different languages.  Labial consonants, however, were unaffected by the above palatalizations.  Instead, at a later time, the  underwent metathesis:

 Lat. rubeum > *robi̯u > Rom. roib

Palatalization of cl and gl clusters
The same process affected latin gl:

 Vulgar Latin oricla > *urecʎa > *urecʎe (Aromanian ureaclje) > Rom. ureche 'ear'
 Vulgar Latin glacia > *gʎatsa > Rom. *gheață 'ice'

l-rhotacism

At some point, Latin intervocalic l developed into r. From the evolution of certain words, it is clear that this happened after the above-mentioned palatalization, but before the simplification of double consonants (as ll did not rhotacize) and also before i-palatalization. Some examples:

 Lat. gelu > Rom. ger 'frost'
 Lat. salīre > Rom. a sări (sărire) 'to jump'

Second palatalization

The dental consonants t, d, s, l were palatalized again by a following i or i̯ (from the combination i̯e/i̯a <  < stressed e):

 Lat. testa > * > *ti̯esta > *țesta > Rom. țeastă 'skull'
 Lat. decem > * > *di̯ece > *dzece > Rom. zece 'ten'
 Lat. servum > * > *si̯erbu > Rom. șerb 'serf'
 Lat. sex > * > *si̯asse > Rom. șase 'six'
 Lat. leporem > * > *li̯ɛpure > * (= Arom. ljepure) > Rom. iepure 'hare'
 Lat. dīcō > *dziku > Rom. zic 'I say'
 Lat. līnum > * (= Arom. ljinu) > * > Rom. in 'flax'
 Lat. gallīna > * > * (= Arom. gãljinã) > Rom. găină 'hen'

The velar consonants  (from Latin labiovelars qu gu) were palatalized to  before front vowels:
 Lat. quid > *ki > Rom. ce 'what'
 Lat. quīnque > Vulgar Latin *cīnque (Italian cinque) > Rom. cinci "five"
 Lat. quaerere "to seek" > *kɛrere > Rom. cere 'ask'
 Lat. *sanguem > *sange > Rom. sânge 'blood'

Modern changes
These are changes that did not happen in all Eastern Romance languages. Some occur in standard Romanian; some do not.

Spirantization
In southern dialects, and in the standard language, dz is lost as a phoneme, becoming z in all environments:

 dzic > zic ('I say')
 lucredzi > lucrezi ('you work')

The affricate  became j  only when hard (i.e. followed by a back vowel):

 gioc  > joc ('game'), but:
 deget  ('finger') did not change.

Lenition of resonants
 Lat. leporem > * > *li̯epure > * > Rom. iepure 'hare'
 Lat. līnum > * > * > Rom. in 'flax'
 Lat. gallīna > * > * > * > Rom. găină 'hen'
 Lat. pellem, pellīs > * > * > * > Rom. piele, piei 'skin, skins'
 Lat. vīnea > *vinja > *viɲă > *viɲe > Rom. vie  'vineyard'

Former intervocalic  from Latin  was lost entirely before  by first vocalizing to :
 Lat stēlla > *stela > archaic steală > colloquial steauă > standard Rom. stea 'star'
 Lat sella > *sɛlla > *si̯ela > *șela > *șeuă > Muntenian șea > standard Rom. șa 'saddle'

Former intervocalic  from Latin  was preserved before other vowels:
 Lat caballum > *cavallu > *caalu > Rom. cal 'horse'
 Lat callem > Rom. cale 'way'

Former intervocalic  (from Latin ) was lost, perhaps first weakened to :
 Lat būbalus > *buvalu > *buwaru > archaic buar, boar > standard Rom. bour 'aurochs'
 Lat vīvere > *vivere > *viwe > Muntenian vie > standard Rom. a via 'to live'

n-epenthesis
Relatively recently, stressed u preceded by n lengthens and nasalizes, producing a following n (epenthesis).
 Lat genuculus > *genuclus > western genuchi > Rom. genunchi 'knee'
 Lat manuplus > *manuclus > western mănuchi > Rom. mănunchi 'bouquet'
 Lat minutus > minut (Aromanian) > (Banat, Moldavia) mănunt > Rom. mărunt 'minute, small'
 the reverse process:
 Lat ranunculus 'tadpole; crowfoot, buttercup' > *ranunclus > archaic rănunchi > Rom. rărunchi 'kidney; (dial.) buttercup' > dialectal răruchi

j-epenthesis
In some words, the semivowel  was inserted between â and soft n:

 pâne > pâine ('bread')
 câne > câine ('dog')

It also explains the plural mână - mâini ('hand, hands'). This is also specific to southern dialects and the standard language; in other regions one may hear câne etc.

It may be compensatory lengthening followed by dissimilation: pâne > pââne > pâine. It has spread from the Oltenian dialect to literary Romanian. It has alternatively been explained as palatalization followed by metathesis: câne > *câni̯e > câine. Oltenian has câine; all other dialects have câni̯e.

Hardening
Backing of vowels after ș, ț and dz is specific to northern dialects. Because those consonants can be followed only by back vowels, any front vowel is changed to a back one:

 și > șî 'and'
 ține > țâni̯e 'holds'
 zic > dzâc 'I say'

It is similar to vowel backing after hard consonants in Russian (see ).

See also 
 Legacy of the Roman Empire
 Romance languages
 Albanian–Romanian linguistic relationship

Notes

References

Sources

Primary sources 

Procopius: History of the Wars (Books VI.16–VII.35.) (With an English Translation by H. B. Dewing) (2006). Harvard University Press. .
The Chronicle of Theophanes Confessor: Byzantine and Near Eastern History, AD 284–813 (Translated with Introduction and Commentary by Cyril Mango and Roger Scott with the assistance of Geoffrey Greatrex) (2006). Oxford University Press. .
The History of Theophylact Simocatta (An English Translation with Introduction and Notes: Michael and Mary Whitby) (1986). Clarendon Press. .

Secondary sources 

Niculescu, Alexandru. Outline History of the Romanian Language.

External links 
 The History of the Romanian Language

 
Indo-European linguistics